Yoni Dray ((), born March 17, 1987) is an Israeli professional basketball player, He is a 1.78 m tall point guard.

Biography 
Dray was born in Marseille, France. At age seven, he moved to Israel with his family and since has lived in Ashdod. Dray is a graduate of the youth department of Elitzur Ashdod.

Playing career
Dray started his career at Hapoel Be'eri in the third division. He played there for three seasons and led the team to qualify from the third division to the second division.

In the beginning of the 2009/10 season, he returned to Ashdod and signed with Maccabi Ashdod. At the end of the season he moved with the club to the first division in Israel. In 2010/11 season, he played in every game. Following the disappointment of his home team, he moved to second league team Hapoel Afula. At Hapoel Afula he became a leader. He played an average of 29.57 minutes, producing 8.3 points, 2.3 rebounds and 6.3 assists.

At the beginning of season 2012/13, he re-signed with Maccabi Ashdod.

References

External links
 Eurobasket profile

1987 births
Point guards
Living people
French men's basketball players
Israeli men's basketball players
Israeli Basketball Premier League players
Hapoel Afula players
Ironi Nahariya players
Israeli people of French-Jewish descent
Maccabi Ashdod B.C. players
Sportspeople from Ashdod
French emigrants to Israel